Seven Sisters was an electoral ward of the Welsh principal area of Neath Port Talbot county borough. The ward, which included, as well as Seven Sisters proper, the lesser settlements of Bryndulais and Nant-y-cafn, was coterminous with the area served by the Seven Sisters Community Council.

Lying in the upper Dulais Valley – in which coalmine workings are still very evident (the village is named after Seven Sisters Colliery which closed in the early 1960s) – the area is characterized by extensive forestry to the north, east and south, and open moorland in the northwest and central areas.

In the 2017 local council elections, the result from Seven Sisters was:

Following a 2020 boundary review by the Local Democracy and Boundary Commission for Wales, Seven Sisters was joined by the neighbouring communities of Crynant and Onllwyn to become 'Crynant, Onllwyn and Seven Sisters', effective from the 2022 local elections.

References

Former wards of Neath Port Talbot